Synthetic Organism Designer is a piece of software created by Craig Venter's team for designing organisms.

References

Artificial life